Thomas Humphreys may refer to:
Thomas Humphreys (athlete) (1890–1967), British athlete
Thomas Basil Humphreys (1840–1890), English-born miner, auctioneer and political figure in British Columbia
Thomas Humphreys (British Army officer) (1878–1955)
Thomas Humphreys (Baptist minister) (died 1909), minister of Seion, Cwmaman

See also
Thomas Humphries (disambiguation)
Thomas Humphrey (disambiguation)